These tables detail the frequencies used in European cable networks. Cable networks use frequencies which are used by different users terrestrially, like the military, police radio, etc. Because of the late introduction of cable television in Europe, older television sets generally could not receive the special cable-only channels, so some countries (like Germany) still have the rule that the public TV stations must be located either in Band I or Band III. The Hyperband was allocated later than the other cable-only channels, so television sets produced in the late 80s and early 90s may lack this band.

In most cable networks, the UHF band is unusable because its frequency is too high, so TV stations are only allocated within Band I, III, the Mid-, Super- and Hyperband. Even in modern cable networks, only some UHF channels (like only channels 21-26) may be usable. This leads to a high level of congestion in many European cable TV networks, especially as analogue transmission, which is still commonplace in cable television in Europe, is being migrated to digital transmission.

Band I

 Channels 2-4, if they are used for TV, are only used for analog transmission. In other cases, the frequencies are in use for DOCSIS.
 Channels D73 and D81 are not formally assigned, but are used in certain regions of Germany as an interim solution until the cable networks are upgraded. In other regions, programs on these channels are usually located in the UHF band.

Midband

 Channel S01 cannot be used at all because it overlaps with the FM radio band.
 The frequency used by channels S02-S05 are used terrestrially for air radio. This has led to disruptions in aircraft operations due to cable TV channels. Therefore, some countries, like Germany, have prohibited the use of these frequencies for analogue transmission in recent times.
 Because analogue VHF transmission used a bandwidth of 7 MHz, but digital transmissions need 8 MHz, the frequencies are shifted accordingly, with one channel being unavailable for digital transmission. Due to the proximity to the FM radio band, some cable networks have opted to further shifting the frequencies by one megahertz.
Because analogue transmission on these frequencies uses 7MHz bandwidth, digital also uses the same bandwidth. QAM carrier frequencies can vary in 0.5MHz steps in the given range.

CCIR Band III

 These channels are only used for analog and digital transmission.
 Because of the CCIR analogue channel raster, digital transmission also uses 7MHz bandwidth channels. Only OIRT channel raster uses 8MHz bandwidth in the VHFIII band.

OIRT Band III

 In VHF band III 8MHz channel bandwidth is not used in the EU for digital transmission.

Superband

Hyperband

Band IV

Band V

See also
 North American cable television frequencies

Bandplans
Television in Europe